The 1970 Middle Tennessee Blue Raiders football team represented Middle Tennessee State University—as a member of the Ohio Valley Conference (OVC) during the 1970 NCAA College Division football season. Led by first-year head coach Bill Peck, the Blue Raiders compiled a record an overall record of 6–3–1 with a mark of 3–3–1 in conference play, placing fifth in the OVC. The team's captains were D. Duvall and T. Edwards.

Schedule

References

Middle Tennessee
Middle Tennessee Blue Raiders football seasons
Middle Tennessee Blue Raiders football